WLDC-LP (105.9 FM) is a radio station licensed to Goshen, Indiana, United States.  The station airs a Spanish language Christian format and is currently owned by Iglesia Sinai Pentecostes, Inc.

References

External links
 WLDC-LP's website
 

LDC
LDC
LDC